Events in the year 1909 in Ireland.

Events
 31 October – The Royal University of Ireland was dissolved.
 14 December – Ernest Shackleton delivered a lecture entitled Nearest the South Pole in the large hall of the National University in Dublin.
 31 December – Harry Ferguson became the first person to fly an aircraft in Ireland, in a monoplane he designed and built himself.
 The Mater Infirmorum Hospital in Belfast was officially recognised as a university teaching hospital.
 Fieldwork for the multidisciplinary Clare Island Survey commenced under the direction of Robert Lloyd Praeger.

Arts and literature
 1 April – Lennox Robinson's first play, The Cross Roads, was performed at the Abbey Theatre in Dublin; he became the theatre manager later in the year.
 22 July – Widowed Irish painter John Lavery married Irish American painter Hazel Martyn.
 20 August – The tenor Enrico Caruso performed at the Theatre Royal in Dublin.
 20 December – The first dedicated cinema in Ireland, the Volta Cinematograph, opened in Dublin under the management of writer James Joyce.
 Herbert Hughes' collection of folk songs, Irish Country Songs, was published, including "She Moved Through the Fair" with words largely composed by Padraic Colum.
 Ella Young's first work of Irish folklore, The Coming of Lugh, was published.

Sport

Association football
International
 13 February – England 4–0 Ireland (in Bradford)
 15 March – Scotland 5–0 Ireland (in Glasgow)
 20 March – Ireland 2–3 Wales (in Belfast)
Irish League
Winners: Linfield F.C.
Irish Cup
Winners: Cliftonville F.C. 0–0 draw; replay result 2-1 Bohemian F.C.

Births
 9 January – Patrick Peyton, priest who promoted the Rosary (died 1992).
 30 January – George Crothers, cricketer (died 1982 in Northern Ireland).
 1 February – Timothy McAuliffe, Labour Party politician (died 1985).
 8 March – Francis MacManus, novelist (died 1965).
 3 April – Knox Cunningham, barrister, businessman, and Ulster Unionist politician (died 1976).
 19 April – Conel Hugh O'Donel Alexander, cryptanalyst, chess player, and chess writer (died 1974).
 24 April – 
 Robert Farren (Roibeárd Ó Faracháin), poet (died 1984).
 David Beers Quinn, historian (died 2002).
30 April – F. E. McWilliam, sculptor (died 1992).
 4 June – Robert Dudley Edwards, historian (died 1988).
7 July – Cecilia Thackaberry, Presentation Sisters nun, killed in Nigeria performing relief work (died 1969).
 24 July – Geoffrey Bing, lawyer and Labour politician in UK (died 1977 in Northern Ireland).
 31 July – Martin White, Kilkenny hurler (died 2011).
 1 August – W. R. Rodgers, writer, broadcaster, teacher, and Presbyterian minister (died 1969).
 4 October – Paddy Moore, association football player (died 1951).
 7 October – Michael O'Neill, nationalist politician and Member of Parliament (MP) (died 1976).
 20 October – James Patrick Scully, awarded George Cross for valour in 1941 in Liverpool in rescuing people from a bomb damaged building.
 28 October – Francis Bacon, painter (died 1992).
 4 November – Sir Basil Goulding, 3rd Baronet, cricketer, squash player, and art collector (died 1982).
 29 November – James Auchmuty, historian (died 1981).
Full date unknown
 Muriel Brandt, artist (died 1981 in Northern Ireland).
 Jack Stanley Gibson, surgeon and writer (died 2005).
 Gabriel Hayes, sculptor, designer of Irish coins (died 1978).
 W. R. Rodgers, poet and writer (died 1969 in Northern Ireland).

Deaths
 10 January – John Conness, United States Senator from California 1863–1869 (born 1821).
 4 February – James Lynam Molloy, poet, songwriter, and composer (born 1837).
3 March – Bishop Richard Owens, Bishop of Clogher 1894–1909 (born 1840).
 19 March – Charles Guilfoyle Doran, Clerk of Works at St Colman's Cathedral, Cobh (born 1835).
 24 March – William Lundon, Irish Parliamentary Party MP (born 1839).
24 March – John Millington Synge, author and playwright (Hodgkin's disease).
 4 April – Sir Theobald Burke, 13th Baronet (born 1833).
 22 May – Sir Rowland Blennerhassett, 4th Baronet, Liberal Party MP (born 1839).
 3 June – Charlotte Grace O'Brien, political and social activist, writer, and plant collector (born 1845).
 15 July – George Tyrrell, expelled Jesuit priest and Modernist Catholic scholar (born 1861).
 1 December – William Joseph Corbet, nationalist politician and MP (born 1824).

References

 
1900s in Ireland
Ireland
Years of the 20th century in Ireland
Ireland